Brampton Meadow is a one hectare biological Site of Special Scientific Interest north-west of Brampton in Cambridgeshire, England.

The site has a rich variety of plant species on calcareous clay pasture, a declining habitat. Plants include quaking-grass, adder's tongue fern, cowslip and green-winged orchid.

The site is on private land with no public access.

References

Sites of Special Scientific Interest in Cambridgeshire